The 2005 Atlanta Braves season marked the franchise's 40th season in Atlanta and the 135th season overall. The Braves won their 11th consecutive division title under Manager of the Year Bobby Cox, finishing 2 games ahead of the second-place Philadelphia Phillies. The Braves lost the 2005 Divisional Series to the Houston Astros, 3 games to 1.

Tim Hudson joined the Braves' rotation and rookies Jeff Francoeur, Kelly Johnson and Brian McCann had their first seasons with Atlanta in 2005.

Offseason
October 15, 2004: DeWayne Wise was selected off waivers by the Detroit Tigers from the Atlanta Braves.
December 3, 2004: Julio Franco was resigned in free agency to the Atlanta Braves.
December 11, 2004: Dan Kolb was acquired by the Atlanta Braves from the Milwaukee Brewers for a player to be named later and José Capellán. The Atlanta Braves sent Alec Zumwalt (minors) (December 14, 2004) to the Milwaukee Brewers to complete the trade.
December 16, 2004: Ex-All-star Tim Hudson was traded by the Oakland Athletics to the Atlanta Braves for Juan Cruz, Dan Meyer, and Charles Thomas.
January 14, 2005: Raúl Mondesí signed as a free agent with the Atlanta Braves.
March 31, 2005: Jorge Sosa was traded by the Tampa Bay Devil Rays to the Atlanta Braves for Nick Green.

Regular season
Jones became one of the quickest in Major League history to 300 home runs. The ball landed in the upper deck in left field at Citizens Bank Park.

Opening Day starters

Season standings

National League East

Record vs. opponents

Notable transactions
April 15, 2005: John Foster signed as a free agent with the Atlanta Braves.
June 1, 2005: Raúl Mondesí was released by the Atlanta Braves.
July 31, 2005: Traded by the Detroit Tigers to the Atlanta Braves for Román Colón and Zach Miner.
August 29, 2005: Todd Hollandsworth was traded by the Chicago Cubs to the Atlanta Braves for Angelo Burrows (minors) and Todd Blackford (minors).
Notable picks in the 2005 Draft include Joey Devine (26th pick overall), Yunel Escobar (2nd round), and Jordan Schafer (3rd round).

Roster

Player stats

Batting

Starters by position
Note: Pos= Position; G = Games played; AB = At bats; H = Hits; Avg. = Batting average; HR = Home runs; RBI = Runs batted in

Other batters
Note: G = Games played; AB = At bats; H = Hits; Avg. = Batting average; HR = Home runs; RBI = Runs batted in

Pitching

Starting pitchers
Note: G = Games pitched; IP = Innings pitched; W = Wins; L = Losses; ERA = Earned run average; SO = Strikeouts

Other pitchers
Note: G = Games pitched; IP = Innings pitched; W = Wins; L = Losses; ERA = Earned run average; SO = Strikeouts

Relief pitchers
Note: G = Games pitched; W = Wins; L = Losses; SV = Saves; ERA = Earned run average; SO = Strikeouts

2005 National League Division Series

Atlanta Braves vs. Houston Astros
Houston wins series, 3–1. Game 4 was a thrilling series clinching 18 inning victory for Houston, and has been cited by many critics as "The greatest first round game in MLB history".

Awards and honors

2005 Major League Baseball season
 Bobby Cox was voted the National League Manager of the Year for the second consecutive year and 3rd time in total.
 John Smoltz was chosen to receive the Roberto Clemente Award. With this honor included, Smoltz became the only player in MLB history to win a Cy Young, and reliever of the year award.
 Andruw Jones led the National League in home runs and runs batted in. He was the recipient of a Gold Glove, Silver Slugger, and the Hank Aaron Award. Jones also finished second in voting for National League Most Valuable Player.
 Jeff Francoeur finished third in voting for National League Rookie of the Year.

2005 Major League Baseball All-Star Game

Andruw Jones and John Smoltz represented the Atlanta Braves in the 2005 All Star Game. Jones hit a home run and Smoltz took the loss in the game.

Farm system

References

 2005 Atlanta Braves at Baseball Reference

National League East champion seasons
Atlanta Braves seasons
Atlanta Braves Season, 2005
Atlanta Braves Season, 2005
Atlanta